Ovaköy is a village in the Silopi district of Şırnak Province in Turkey. The village is populated by Kurds of the Tayan tribe and had a population of 228 in 2021.

The hamlet of Bayındır is attached to Ovaköy.

References 

Villages in Silopi District
Kurdish settlements in Şırnak Province